Cotter Schools is located in Winona, Minnesota and is the sole Roman Catholic school in the city. Educational opportunities begin in preschool for children 16 months or older and continue through Grade 12. Boarding is available for students in grades 7-12. The school opened its doors on September 5, 1911 as the "Cotter School for Boys" with 11 students. Cotter, named for the diocese’s first bishop, Bishop Joseph Bernard Cotter, was a boys school directed by the Christian Brothers of Saint John Baptist de La Salle. In 1952, the Brothers turned the operation of the school over to the diocese and Cotter became co-educational with the combining of the Cathedral Girls High School. In 1953 a new Cotter building was erected and in 1962 an addition was added. In 1992, with help from an endowment from the Hiawatha Education Foundation, the school moved to its current location on the campus of the former College of Saint Teresa, allowing it to add a boarding school component.

Cotter Family 
The term "Cotter Family" refers to all the students, teachers, parents, administrators, alumni, volunteers and church members affiliated with the school. Many of these members are in several groups. Roughly 50% of the faculty are alumni. Roughly 25-50%, depending on the year, of the student body are children of alumni, some third and fourth generations. In 1993, local businessmen, headed by Bob Kierlin of Fastenal, started an endowment fund of several million dollars granting the school a technological make-over and allowing it to move to the Saint Teresa campus.

2021 Expansion 
On July 1, 2021, Cotter Schools began offering educational opportunities for students from ages 16 months through 12th grade. For the 2021-2022 school year, all grades will remain at their current locations. Campuses include:
 Main Square Campus: Montessori 16 months – 6 years
 St. Mary’s Campus: 6 months – Kindergarten
 St. Stan’s Campus: Grades 1-4
 St. Teresa’s Campus: Grades 5-6
 St. Teresa’s Campus: Grades 7-8
 St. Teresa’s Campus: Grades 9-12

Notable alumni
Mike Leaf (class of 1979) – College basketball coach at Winona State University.
Grace Ping (class of 2020) – Runner at Oklahoma State University.

References

External links
Cotter High School

Roman Catholic Diocese of Winona-Rochester
Catholic secondary schools in Minnesota
Buildings and structures in Winona, Minnesota
Educational institutions established in 1911
Schools in Winona County, Minnesota
1911 establishments in Minnesota